Donald F. Capelle is a Marshallese politician. He was Speaker of the Legislature of the Marshall Islands from 2012 to 2016. In January 2020 Capelle became Minister of Transportation, Communication and Information Technology in the cabinet of President David Kabua.

On 29 November 2012, Capelle met with Taiwanese President Ma Ying-jeou.

References 

Living people
Government ministers of the Marshall Islands
Members of the Legislature of the Marshall Islands
Speakers of the Legislature of the Marshall Islands
Year of birth missing (living people)